George Lantei Lamptey is a retired Ghanaian jurist and justice of the Supreme Court of Ghana.

Early life and education
Lamptey is a native of Jamestown, Accra. He was born in Accra on 3 June 1932 to Maa Kowa and Akwete Aku.
He had his secondary education at the Accra Academy from 1948 to 1951 and continued at Achimota College for his Higher School Certificate. He later proceeded to the United Kingdom to pursue further studies at the University of Durham from 1955 to 1958. He had his solicitor's education in Newcastle upon Tyne completing in 1961 and returning to Ghana that same year.

Career
His career begun as an Assistant Registrar General in 1962 at Accra. He was also a part-time lecturer at the school of administration, University of Ghana from 1962 to 1965. He became a District Court Judge in 1965 and consequently became a member of the Commonwealth Magistrates Association. He rose through the ranks from a District Court Judge to a High Court Judge and later an Appeal Court Judge in 1989. In 1990, he was an external examiner for the Ghana School of Law. He was appointed Supreme Court Judge on July, 2000. He took his oath of office with Justice Theodore Adzoe on 7 December 2000. He retired on 3 June 2002.

Personal life
He was married Mary Awule Mele Lamptey (née Halm) daughter of W.M.Q. Halm the then Ghana ambassador to the United States of America at the Washington DC Cathedral, USA. Together they have three children. He is a devoted Methodist and preaches in selected churches.

See also
List of judges of the Supreme Court of Ghana
Supreme Court of Ghana

References

Living people
1932 births
20th-century Ghanaian judges
Alumni of the Accra Academy
Alumni of Achimota School
Justices of the Supreme Court of Ghana
Alumni of King's College, Newcastle
21st-century Ghanaian judges